Hans Tausen Ice Cap is an ice cap in Peary Land, northern Greenland. Administratively it is part of the Northeast Greenland National Park.

Age
Ice cores show it is around  3500–4000 years old. It formed since the Holocene climatic optimum of 6000-8000 BP. It is a well studied ice cap, and is important to understanding the Holocene climatic optimum.

Geography
The ice cap is located south of Amundsen Land and the Nordpasset, at the western end of the De Long Fjord area, east of Freuchen Land across the inner J.P. Koch Fjord, west of Odin Fjord and south of the O.B. Bøggild Fjord.

The Hans Tausen Ice Cap is the source of many glaciers, including the Ymer Glacier to the east, the Aajaku Glacier, Inukitsaq Glacier and Persuaq Glacier to the west, and the Lur Glacier and Tjalfe Glacier to the north.

See also
List of glaciers in Greenland

References

External links
Hans Tausen Iskappe, North Greenland - Studies Using an Ice Flow Model
Ice caps of Greenland
Landforms of North America
Peary Land